Jessica Hall may refer to:

 Jessica Hall (American actress) (born 1983)
 Jessica Hall (British actress) (born 1981)
 Jessica Hall (rower) (born 1992), Australian rower